The 2018 Nicholls State Colonels football team represented Nicholls State University as a member of the Southland Conference during the 2018 NCAA Division I FCS football season. Led by fourth-year head coach Tim Rebowe, the Colonels compiled an overall record of 9–4 with a mark of 7–2 in conference play, sharing the Southland title with Incarnate Word. Nicholls State received the Southland's automatic bid to the NCAA Division I Football Championship, beating San Diego in the first round before losing to Eastern Washington in the second round. The team played home games at John L. Guidry Stadium in Thibodaux, Louisiana.

Previous season
The Colonels finished the 2017 season with an overall record of 8–4 and a 7–2 record in Southland play to finish in a tie for third place. They received an at-large bid to the FCS Playoffs where they were defeated by South Dakota in the first round.

Preseason

Preseason All-Conference Teams
On July 12, 2018, the Southland announced their Preseason All-Conference Teams, with the Colonels having a conference leading 14 players selected.

Offense First Team
 Chase Fourcade – Jr. QB
 Damion Jeanpiere – Sr. WR
 Ryan Hanley – Sr. OL
 Chandler Arceneaux – Sr. OL

Defense First Team
 Sully Laiche – Jr. DL
 Kenny Dotson – Sr. DL
 Allen Pittman – Jr. LB
 Hezekiah White – Sr. LB
 Corey Abraham – Sr. DB
 Ahmani Martin – Sr. DB

Offense Second Team
 Kyran Irvin – Jr. RB
 Dai’jean Dixon – Sr. WR
 Eddie Houston – Sr. OL
 Lorran Fonseca – Sr. P

Preseason poll
On July 19, 2018, the Southland announced their preseason poll, with the Colonels predicted to finish in second place.

Roster

Schedule

Game summaries

at Kansas

at Tulane

at McNeese State

Sam Houston State

Lamar

at Northwestern State

at Abilene Christian

Incarnate Word

at Houston Baptist

Stephen F. Austin

Southeastern Louisiana

San Diego–NCAA Division I First Round

at Eastern Washington–NCAA Division I Second Round

Ranking movements

References

Nicholls
Nicholls Colonels football seasons
Southland Conference football champion seasons
Nicholls
Nicholls Colonels football